Jack Price (10 May 1884 – 2 December 1965) was a British long-distance runner. He competed in the men's marathon at the 1908 Summer Olympics.

References

External links
 

1884 births
1965 deaths
Athletes (track and field) at the 1908 Summer Olympics
British male long-distance runners
British male marathon runners
Olympic athletes of Great Britain
Place of birth missing